Shi Xiaodong (born 26 February 1997) is a Chinese footballer currently playing as a goalkeeper for Nantong Zhiyun.

Club career
Shi Xiaodong was promoted to the Chinese Super League side Shanghai SIPG's first team squad by Sven-Göran Eriksson in 2016. He would be used as a reserve choice goalkeeper for several seasons and was part of the squad that won the 2018 Chinese Super League title. To gain some playing time he would be loaned out to second tier club Nantong Zhiyun and would go on to make his debut in a league game on 13 September 2020 against Xinjiang Tianshan Leopard in a 2-0 victory. On 6 March 2021, Shi would make his loan move permanent. He would go on to establish himself within the team and helped the club gain promotion to the top tier at the end of the 2022 China League One season.

Career statistics
.

Honours

Club
Shanghai SIPG
Chinese Super League: 2018

References

External links

1997 births
Living people
Footballers from Shanghai
Chinese footballers
China youth international footballers
Association football goalkeepers
China League One players
Shanghai Port F.C. players
Nantong Zhiyun F.C. players